Dr. Hila Korach (born 2 March 1984) is an Israeli journalist, television hostess, radio presenter, and physician.

Early life
Korach was born in Tel Aviv, the third child in her family. Her mother worked in Special Education, and her father was an Engineer in the Israel Aerospace Industries, who had emigrated from Hungary.
Korach started her career in the media during her army service at the Galei Tzahal radio station, and went on to become the head of the newscaster department She has worked on several TV networks including Channel 10,  and has edited and presented radio news stories.

Career
After completing her army service, she began working at Channel 10, where she was the hostess of the show "Kol Boker" (Every Morning) for a year and a half. After that, she became a newscaster and news editor. At the same time, she began hosting the TV Program "HaArchiyon", which included live clip reeusts, on Israel's channel 24.

In 2005 she participated in the game show "HaMo'ach", hosted by Erez Tal on channel 2, and won first place and was awarded 350 thousand NIS.

In 2006, she was chosen to host the student program on the campus channel.

From 2007 and on she has been hosting the morning show "HaOlam HaBoker"  alongside Avri Gilad (formerly: Reshet Al HaBoker), on Israel's channel 2, and as of November it is broadcast on Israel's channel 13. Korach and Gilad won first prize for the "Green Light for the Media" award for 2008, and donated their award of 10,000 NIS to the "Kavim Umachashavot" non-profit organization, in order to promote awareness of attention deficit hyperactivity disorder.

In 2009 Korach hosted a TV series on the topic of wedding on the good-life channel. She hosted the evening show "Ulpan Layla" on channel 2 between 2010-2011.

As of 2010 Korach hosts the daily TV Science show "Galileo" on Israel's Education TV channel, which was also broadcast on channel 2.

In 2010 she returned to "Galei Tzahal" radio station and hosted the show "Nachon LeHaboker" (As of this morning). After half a year she left this position, after accepting the request to focus solely on a Television career.

Korach writes a weekly column in the popular "Maariv Sofshavua" newspaper.

In 2016, she aired a documentary show named "Masa Hakafa" with chef Meir Adonai. During that same year, the show "Galileo" was awarded the Israeli Academia Prize for Television, in the category of shows for children and youth.

Studies
Hila has recently graduated from medical school.

She also holds a bachelor's degree in Psychology and Political Science, as well as a master's degree in Diplomacy.

She and her husband have three children.

References

External links
 

1984 births
Living people
Israeli Jews
People from Tel Aviv
Tel Aviv University alumni
Israeli television presenters
Israeli women television presenters
Israeli people of Hungarian-Jewish descent